AOTD may refer to:

Organizations
 Second Investigation Department, Lithuanian military intelligence agency

Other uses
 Art of the Drink, the first video podcast to focus exclusively on bartending
 Asylum of the Daleks, the first episode of the seventh series of the British science fiction television series Doctor Who